Deifebo Burbarini (1619 in Siena – March 4, 1680) was an Italian painter of the Baroque period.

He was a pupil of Raffaello Vanni. He was active in the Province of Siena and Rome, painting mainly religious altarpieces. He painted in the church of San Giovannino della Staffa, Siena.

References

Notes
Also see German Wikipedia entry.

17th-century Italian painters
Italian male painters
1619 births
1680 deaths
Painters from Siena
Italian Baroque painters